Splendrillia westralis is a species of sea snail, a marine gastropod mollusk in the family Drilliidae.

Description

Distribution
This marine species is endemic to Northwest Australia.

References

 Wells F.E. (1993) New records of Splendrillia (Gastropoda: Turridae) from northwestern Australia, with the description of a new species. Journal of the Malacological Society of Australia 14: 113–117

External links
  Tucker, J.K. 2004 Catalog of recent and fossil turrids (Mollusca: Gastropoda). Zootaxa 682:1–1295.

westralis
Gastropods of Australia
Gastropods described in 1993